Sediminibacillus halophilus is a Gram-positive, oxidase positive, catalase negative, moderately halophilic, rod-shaped and motile bacterium from the genus of Sediminibacillus which has been isolated from sediments from the Lake Erliannor from the Mongolia. S.I. Paul et al. (2021) isolated and biochemically characterized Sediminibacillus halophilus (strains CS26, CS39, WS5) from marine sponges of the Saint Martin's island of the Bay of Bengal, Bangladesh.

References

 

Bacillaceae
Bacteria described in 2008